Lois Wilson may refer to:

Lois W. also known as Lois Wilson (née Burnham) (1891–1988), American co-founder of Al-Anon and wife of Alcoholics Anonymous founder Bill W.
Lois Wilson (actress) (1894–1988), actress in silent films
Lois Miriam Wilson (born 1927), first female Moderator of the United Church of Canada, 1980–1982